Badaracco is a surname. Notable people with the surname include:

Elvira Badaracco
Giovanni Raffaele Badaracco (1648–1717), Italian painter
Giuseppe Badaracco (1588–1657), Italian painter
Joseph L. Badaracco (born 1948), American author and academic

Italian-language surnames